The Conversation Papers (formerly Conversation Poetry Quarterly) is a UK-based poetry magazine founded in 2007 and produced by The Conversation Paperpress. The magazine aims to promote the idea of poetry as a socially critical art  and is the connected to the Dialecticist school of poetic thought.

In 2009 it became the English-language publication of The Conversation International  - a radical writing and publishing collective with members from countries across the world, with the aim of creating a cross-cultural poetic dialogue through translation and co-operative publishing.

References

External links
 Official website

Literary magazines published in the United Kingdom
Magazines established in 2007
Poetry magazines published in the United Kingdom